Bahieae is a tribe of plants in the family Asteraceae, mostly native to North America and Mexico. It was described by Baldwin et al. in 2002.

Taxonomy
Bahieae genera recognized by the Global Compositae Database as of April 2022:

Achyropappus 
Apostates 
Bahia 
Bartlettia 
Chaetymenia 
Chamaechaenactis 
Espejoa 
Florestina 
Holoschkuhria 
Hymenopappus 
Hymenothrix 
Hypericophyllum 
Loxothysanus 
Nothoschkuhria 
Palafoxia 
Peucephyllum 
Picradeniopsis 
Platyschkuhria 
Psathyrotopsis 
Schkuhria 
Thymopsis

References

 
Asteraceae tribes